Droopy, Master Detective is an American animated television series produced by Hanna-Barbera Cartoons in association with Turner Entertainment, and a spin-off of Tom & Jerry Kids. It debuted on Fox's Saturday morning block Fox Kids and ran for 13 episodes from September 11 to December 3, 1993; in 1994, it was dropped from Fox's Saturday morning schedule on January 1, and returned on weekday afternoons in August and September.

Premise 
Droopy, Master Detective is a spoof of detective films and cop shows, featuring Droopy and his son, Dripple, as detectives on the mean streets of a big city. Newly made seven-minute episodes were mixed in with new seven-minute cartoons featuring the Tom and Jerry Kids characters. The rest of the half-hour program mostly was taken up by Screwy Squirrel, another Tex Avery creation from the 1940s.

In these new cartoons, Screwy made his home in a public park, making life miserable for hot-headed park attendant Dweeble and his dog Rumpley — both, rather typical Hanna-Barbera comedy foes rather than Tex Avery-inspired characters. It also included two more characters from the previous show: Wild Mouse and Lightning Bolt the Super Squirrel.

Cast

Main 
 Don Messick as Droopy
 Charlie Adler as Dripple, Screwball Squirrel, Lightning Bolt the Super Squirrel
 William Callaway as Rumpley
 Teresa Ganzel as Miss Vavoom, Misty Mouse (in "Primeval Prey")
 Frank Welker as McWolf, Dweeble, Wild Mouse, Grunch the Caveman

Additional voices 

 Brandon Adams
 Joe Alaskey
 Patricia Alice Albrecht
 Lewis Arquette
 René Auberjonois
 Michael Bell as Roqueford Le Poulet (in "The Case of Pierre Le Poulet")
 Gregg Berger
 Sheryl Bernstein
 Susan Blu as Auntie Snoople (in "Aunt Snoople")
 Sorrell Booke
 Charlie Brill
 Nicole Brown
 S. Scott Bullock
 Arthur Burghardt
 Greg Burson
 Hamilton Camp
 Nancy Cartwright
 Marsha Clark
 Selette Cole
 Townsend Coleman
 Danny Cooksey
 Bud Cort
 Jesse Corti
 Peter Cullen
 Brian Cummings
 Jim Cummings as The Blobfather (in "The Monster Mob"), Baby Bandit (in "The Babyman Bank Heists"), Frankenator (in "The Monster Mob"), McWolf's Horse, Pierre Le Poulet (in "The Case of Pierre Le Poulet"), The Raj
 Tim Curry
 Jennifer Darling as Fifi
 Mari Devon
 Nancy Dussault
 Maggie Egan
 June Foray
 Pat Fraley as The Yolker (in "Return of the Yolker")
 Brad Garrett
 Kathy Garver
 Dick Gautier
 Barry Gordon
 Joan Gerber
 Archie Hahn
 Phil Hartman
 Pamela Hayden
 George Hearn
 Dana Hill
 Jerry Houser as Dragon
 Charity James
 Nick Jameson
 Tony Jay
 Arte Johnson as Shadowman (in "Shadowman and the Blue Pigeon")
 Vicki Juditz
 Zale Kessler
 Kip King
 Paul Kreppel
 Maurice LaMarche as Thundergut the Super Squirrel (in "Battle of the Super Squirrels")
 David Lander
 Nancy Linari as Zombina (in "The Monster Mob")
 Allan Lurie
 Sherry Lynn
 Tress MacNeille
 Kenneth Mars
 Chuck McCann as Baby Bandit's Henchman (in "The Babyman Bank Heists")
 Edie McClurg
 Diane Michelle
 Brian Stokes Mitchell
 Alan Oppenheimer
 Bibi Osterwald as Tera Boom-Boom
 Gary Owens as the Narrator
 Valery Pappas
 Patricia Parris
 Rob Paulsen as Edna Evergreen, Crummy McMummy (in "The Monster Mob"), Prime Minister Luck-Nuck, Oliver J. Tudball (in "The Case of the Snooty Star")
 Patrick Pinney
 Henry Polic II
 Tony Pope
 Hal Rayle
 Clive Revill
 Robert Ridgely
 Kimmy Robertson
 Stuart Robinson
 Roger Rose as Johnsy Megabucks
 Neil Ross
 Ronnie Schell
 Susan Silo
 Sarah Silverman as Melody WOOO-WOOO Stardust
 Hal Smith
 Kath Soucie
 Michael Stanton
 Sally Struthers
 Barbara Stuart
 Marcelo Tubert
 Janet Waldo as Wild Mouse's Mother (in "Primeval Prey")
 B.J. Ward as The Mistress of Baskerville Manor (in "Sherlock Droopy Gets Hounded")
 Jimmy Weldon
 Jane Wiedlin
 Lee Wilkof
 April Winchell
 Paul Winchell as Rumpley's Dad
 Joanne Worley
 Kris Zimmerman
 Patric Zimmerman

Episodes

Home media 
The show is currently only available on the Boomerang subscription streaming service app. As of June 2020, the show has yet to be released on DVD from Warner Archive.

References

External links 

 
 Droopy, Master Detective at the Big Cartoon DataBase

Television series by Hanna-Barbera
1990s American animated television series
1990s American satirical television series
American animated television spin-offs
1993 American television series debuts
1993 American television series endings
English-language television shows
Fox Kids
Fox Broadcasting Company original programming
Animated television series about dogs
Droopy
American detective television series
American children's animated mystery television series
American children's animated comedy television series
Big Bad Wolf
Tom and Jerry television series
Comedy franchises